The 1972–73 Ranji Trophy was the 39th season of the Ranji Trophy. Bombay won their 15th title in a row defeating Tamil Nadu in the final.

Highlights
 Bombay won their 15th successive Ranji Trophy. This is a record for the national championships in the Test countries. Bombay lost the 1973–74 semifinal to Karnataka on first innings lead.
 27 wickets fell on the second day of the Bombay – Tamil Nadu final at Chepauk. The match ended on the first ball of the third day
 Ajit Wadekar captained Bombay to the title for the fourth time. He had already captained in the 1968–69, 1969–70 and 1971–72 finals. As of 2017, C. K. Nayudu of Holkar is the only other captain to win four Ranji titles.

Group stage

South Zone

North Zone

East Zone

West Zone

Central Zone

Knockout stage

Final

Scorecards and averages
Cricketarchive

References

External links

Ranji Trophy
Ranji Trophy
Ranji Trophy seasons